Eurata maritana is a moth of the subfamily Arctiinae. It was described by Schaus in 1896. It is found in Paraná, Brazil.

References

Arctiinae
Moths described in 1896